Casablanca, Nest of Spies is a 1963 French-Spanish-Italian spy film directed by Henri Decoin and starring Sara Montiel, Maurice Ronet and Franco Fabrizi.  Set in 1942 in Casablanca, it was shot in Alicante.

Plot

Cast 

 Sara Montiel as Teresa 
 Maurice Ronet  as Maurice Desjardins 
 Franco Fabrizi as Max von Stauffen
 Leo Anchóriz as Lucien
 José Guardiola as Pierrot
 Gérard Tichy as The Mayor
 Matilde Muñoz Sampedro		
 Naima Lamcharki
 Isarco Ravaioli 		 
 Lorenzo Robledo 	
 Carlo Croccolo

References

External links

1963 films
Spanish spy thriller films
French spy thriller films
Italian spy thriller films
1960s spy thriller films
Films directed by Henri Decoin
Films set in 1942
Films set in Casablanca
1960s French films
1960s Spanish films
1960s Italian films